Ian Tapp is an English sound engineer. He won an Oscar for Best Sound Mixing for the film Slumdog Millionaire. He has worked on over 120 films since 1987.

Selected filmography
 Slumdog Millionaire (2008)

References

External links

Year of birth missing (living people)
Living people
British audio engineers
Best Sound Mixing Academy Award winners
Best Sound BAFTA Award winners